Repniki is a rural locality (a village) in Klyazminskoye Rural Settlement, Kovrovsky District, Vladimir Oblast, Russia. The population was 3 as of 2010.

Geography 
Repniki is located 22 km northeast of Kovrov (the district's administrative centre) by road. Knyaginkino is the nearest rural locality.

References 

Rural localities in Kovrovsky District